The Indonesia women's under-19 cricket team represents Indonesia in international under-19 women's cricket. The team is administrated by Cricket Indonesia (CI).

Indonesia qualified for the inaugural ICC Under-19 Women's T20 World Cup via winning the East Asia-Pacific Qualifier, winning a three-match series against Papua New Guinea 2–1 thereby becoming the first Indonesian team to qualify for an ICC global tournament. They were eliminated in the first group stage at the tournament.

History
The inaugural Women's Under-19 World Cup was scheduled to take place in January 2021, but was postponed multiple times due to the COVID-19 pandemic. The tournament was eventually scheduled to take place in 2023, in South Africa. Indonesia competed in the East-Asia Pacific Qualifier for the tournament in August 2022, which consisted of a three-match series against Papua New Guinea. They won the series 2–1 to qualify for the 2023 Under-19 World Cup.

Indonesia announced their squad for the tournament on 3 January 2023. At the tournament, they lost all three of their matches in the first group stage, although they did beat Zimbabwe in a subsequent play-off.

Recent call-ups
The table below lists all the players who have been selected in recent squads for Indonesia under-19s. Currently, this only includes the squad for the 2023 ICC Under-19 Women's T20 World Cup.

Records & statistics
International match summary

As of 20 January 2023

Youth Women's Twenty20 record versus other nations

As of 20 January 2023

Under-19 World Cup record

References

Women's Under-19 cricket teams
C
Indonesia in international cricket